Béthune (archaic  and Bethwyn historically in English) is a city in northern France, sub-prefecture of the Pas-de-Calais department.

Geography
Béthune is located in the former province of Artois.

Landmarks
Béthune is a town rich in architectural heritage and history. The chime of the belfry is composed of thirty-six bells. A belfry (French:"beffroi") has stood on the site since 1346. The current belfry plays melodies every 15 minutes, including the ch'ti (regional patois) children's lullaby "min p'tit quinquin" (my little darling). In 2005, the belfry was inscribed on the UNESCO World Heritage List as part of the Belfries of Belgium and France site, because of its architecture and testimony to the rise of municipal power in Europe.

History

Hugh Hastings (died 1347), King Edward III of England's captain and lieutenant in Flanders, mounted an attack and laid siege to Béthune, with a combined English and Flemish force, during a diversionary raid as part of Chevauchée of Edward III of 1346.  After religious persecution, the of Bethune's inhabitants moved to Scotland, where some still live today.  They then went to North Carolina, USA to hope for a better life in farming. The Flemish component proved undisciplined and the siege was abandoned in failure before the end of August.

During the War of the Spanish Succession in July–August 1710, Béthune was besieged by forces of the Grand Alliance. The town eventually surrendered after a vigorous defence conducted by Antoine de Vauban (1654-1731), a relative of the famous military engineer Vauban.

In World War I, Béthune was an important railway junction and command centre for the British Canadian Corps and Indian Expeditionary Force,  as well as the 33rd Casualty Station until December 1917. On 21 May, a bombardment destroyed large parts of the town, killing more than 100 civilians. Over 3,200 casualties are buried in Béthune Town Cemetery, the Commonwealth section of which was designed by Edwin Lutyens; the majority are British (2,933) or Canadian (55), the remainder German.

Rebuilt after the war, Béthune was badly damaged once more by air attacks and house to house fighting on 24–26 May 1940 when it was captured by the SS Panzer Division Totenkopf. The Totenkopf suffered heavy casualties and anger at their losses allegedly played a role in the Le Paradis massacre on 27 May, when 97 members of the Royal Norfolk Regiment were shot after surrendering. During the war, many townspeople were deported to work in Germany; the town was officially liberated on 4 September 1944.

Transport

Béthune station has seven daily TGV trains to Paris, a journey which takes 1 hour 15 minutes. There are also regular trains to Lille, Amiens, Dunkerque and several regional destinations.

Béthune is served by the Lens-Béthune bus network.

By car, Béthune is accessible from the A26 which intersects the A1 (Lille to Paris)  to the south-east. By road, it is 2 hours 30 minutes from Paris, 1 hour from Calais, 30 minutes from Arras and 40 minutes from Lille. By using the Channel Tunnel and the A26, Béthune is 3 hours 30 minutes from London and 6 hours 45 minutes from Manchester. Using road connections on mainland Europe it is nearly 2 hours from Brussels, 3 hours from Aix-La-Chapelle, 3 hours from Cologne, 8 hours 30 minutes from Berlin and 3 hours 30 minutes from Amsterdam.

Population

The inhabitants are called Béthunois.

Personalities
Béthune was the birthplace of:
 Jean Buridan, philosopher
 Antoine Busnois, composer and poet of the early Renaissance
 Jérôme Leroy, former captain of RC Lens and current FC Sochaux midfielder in France
 Pierre de Manchicourt, Renaissance composer
 Nicolas Fauvergue, footballer
 Thomas Crecquillon, the Renaissance composer, probably died here.
 Tristan Charpentier, racing driver
Béthune is also associated with the following historic personalities:
 Maximilien de Béthune, duc de Sully, general and statesman
 Conon de Béthune, crusader and trouvère poet

Sport
Stade Béthunois Football Club represent Béthune and was formed in 1902. They currently play in Nord-Pas-de-Calais league.

International relations

Béthune is twinned with:
 Schwerte, Germany
 Hastings, United Kingdom since 1972.
 Sully-sur-Loire, France
 Kortrijk, Belgium

Gallery

See also
Communes of the Pas-de-Calais department

References

External links

Béthune city council website (in French)
Béthune on Heritage Towns
"Histoire de Béthune" (in French)

 
Communes of Pas-de-Calais
Subprefectures in France
County of Artois